Badminton had its debut as an official medal sport at the 1992 Summer Olympics. It was held from 28 July to 4 August 1992. Four events were held in the first competition of the sport: men's singles, women's singles, men's doubles, and women's doubles. Badminton was contested in the Pavelló de la Mar Bella. 36 nations entered competitors, with a total of 177 entrants. Asian nations won fifteen of the sixteen medals, with their dominance being broken only by Denmark's bronze medal in the men's singles.

The tournament was single-elimination.  Matches consisted of three sets, with sets being to 15 except in women's singles, where sets were to 11.  No playoffs were contested for semi-final losers, meaning that two bronze medals were awarded in each event.  Similarly, all four players/pairs defeated in the quarterfinals for each event were awarded fifth place.

Medallists

Medal table
In 1992, there were no bronze medal matches to decide 3rd and 4th place.  Both semifinal losers won bronze medals.

Results

Men's singles

The men's singles resulted in the only non-Asian medallist, Thomas Stuer-Lauridsen of Denmark.  57 players from 32 nations competed in men's singles.

Women's singles

The winner of the women's singles competition received the first official badminton medal in Olympic history.  It was also the first gold medal for Indonesia, which before had only won one silver (in archery).  52 players from 27 nations competed in women's singles.

Men's doubles

Malaysia won its first Olympic medal in the men's doubles competitions in badminton.  30 pairs from 21 nations competed in men's doubles.

Women's doubles

29 pairs from 20 nations competed in women's doubles.

Participation
A total of 177 badminton players from 36 Olympic Committees (NOCs) from the five Continental Confederations will participate at the 1992 Summer Olympics.

Participating nations
Below is the list of NOCs participants in badminton competition at the 1992 Summer Olympics.

 

 Host

References

External links
 Draws and results at the 1992 Summer Olympics - InternationalBadminton.org

 
Summer Olympics
1992 Summer Olympics events
1992
Summer Olympics,1992